Stephanie Lynn Robinson is a Canadian actress and producer.

Based in Austin, Texas, Robinson is a graduate of the Broadway Dance Center and American Musical and Dramatic Academy in New York City. She has voiced characters such as Priscilla in Freaktown, Ping and Chachi in Julius Jr., twins Kelly and Kelli in Looped, numerous roles on Super Why! and Little Charmers, and the reindeer Dancer in Elliot the Littlest Reindeer. She has been nominated for five consecutive Voice Arts Awards for "Outstanding TV Animation - Best Voiceover" and "Outstanding Animation Demo Reel" by the Society of Voice Arts & Sciences.

As a producer, Robinson has worked with Stornoway Productions as an associate producer of the Pet Network series Dog Park Tales. She is also credited a producer on the documentaries Infestation, The Civilian-Military Divide: Bridging the Gap, OMG!, and Investigation Discovery's Blood, Lies and Alibis.

Filmography

Film

Television

Stage

References

External links

Living people
Canadian stage actresses
Canadian voice actresses
Year of birth missing (living people)